Iraya can refer to:

 Iraya people, an ethnic group of the Mangyan people
 Iraya language, spoken by Mangyans in the province of Mindoro in the Philippines.
 Iraya Robles, a queercore musician with band Sta-Prest
 Mount Iraya, a volcano in the Philippines